Shashikala Annasaheb Jolle (born 20 November 1969, nee Shashikala Haradare), is an Indian social worker and politician. On 20 August 2019 she was inducted as the Cabinet Minister in the BJP Government led by B.S. Yediyurappa. Member of the Legislative Assembly for the Nippani constituency, she is leader of the Bharatiya Janata Party.

Shashikala was elected to 14th Karnataka Legislative Assembly in 2013 election from Nippani constituency with 81,860 votes.

She was re-elected from Nippani in the 2018 Karnataka Legislative Assembly elections polling 87,006 votes. On 20 August 2019 she was inducted as the Cabinet Minister in the BJP Government led by B.S. Yediyurappa. Shashikala defeated Kaka Sao Patil of Congress Party and Ishwar Kamath of BSP.

Shashikala Jolle and her husband Annasaheb Jolle, both contested on BJP tickets from Nippani and Chikkodi-Sadalga constituencies respectively. However, Annasaheb Jolle lost to Ganesh Hukkeri for the second time whereas Shashikala Jolle emerged victoriously. Annasaheb Jolle later won Chikkodi Lok Sabha seat in 2019 Indian general elections.

References

1969 births
Living people
People from Belagavi district
Bharatiya Janata Party politicians from Karnataka
Women members of the Karnataka Legislative Assembly
21st-century Indian women politicians
21st-century Indian politicians
Karnataka MLAs 2013–2018
Karnataka MLAs 2018–2023